Chicoreus (Triplex) spectrum is a species of sea snail, a marine gastropod mollusk in the family Muricidae, the murex snails or rock snails.

Description
The shell size varies between 23 mm and 165 mm

Distribution
This uncommon species is distributed in the Caribbean Sea and the Lesser Antilles; in the Atlantic Ocean offBrazil, living at depths from 30–100 metres

References

 Garrigues B. & Lamy D. (2019). Inventaire des Muricidae récoltés au cours de la campagne MADIBENTHOS du MNHN en Martinique (Antilles Françaises) et description de 12 nouvelles espèces des genres Dermomurex, Attilosa, Acanthotrophon, Favartia, Muricopsis et Pygmaepterys (Mollusca, Gastropoda). Xenophora Taxonomy. 23: 22-59

External links
 Reeve L.A. (1845-1849). Monograph of the genus Murex. In: Conchologia Iconica, vol. 3, pl. 1-37 and unpaginated text. L. Reeve & Co., London.

Gastropods described in 1846
Chicoreus